Brent sidings was an important marshalling yard and freight facility on the Midland Railway extension to London.

History

Coal traffic
Coal trains, each consisting of up to 85 wagons, were despatched from the marshalling yards at Toton (between Nottingham and Derby), and received at Brent sidings. Here, they were split up and forwarded to the Midland Railway's own coal depots around London, and also to the London area marshalling yards belonging to other railways.

Locomotives
The coal trains from Toton were so heavy that two 0-6-0 locomotives were usually required; from 1927, special LMS Garratt locomotives were built for this traffic, one of which could handle a similar load as two of the normal locomotives.

Notes

References

Midland Railway
Rail yards in the United Kingdom